This is a list of singles that charted in the top ten of the ARIA Charts in 2013.

Top-ten singles

Key

2012 peaks

2014 peaks

Entries by artist
The following table shows artists who achieved two or more top 10 entries in 2013, including songs that reached their peak in 2012 and 2014. The figures include both main artists and featured artists. The total number of weeks an artist spent in the top ten in 2013 is also shown.

See also
2013 in music
ARIA Charts
List of number-one singles of 2013 (Australia)
List of top 25 singles for 2013 in Australia

References

2013 in Australia
Australia Top 10
Top 10 singles 2013
Australia 2013